Guangdong-Hong Kong-Macao University Alliance (GHMUA) is an alliance of 37 prestigious universities located in China, Hong Kong and Macau. It was established on 15 November 2016.

GHMUA members includes world's renowned research universities such as Tsinghua University's Shenzhen International Graduate School, University of Hong Kong, Hong Kong University of Science and Technology,  Sun Yat-Sen University, South University of Science and Technology and University of Macao.

List of member institutions

Guangdong 
 Sun Yat-sen University
 South China University of Technology
 Jinan University
 South China Agricultural University
 Southern Medical University
 Guangzhou University of Chinese Medicine
 South China Normal University
 Guangdong University of Technology
 Guangdong University of Foreign Studies
 Shantou University
 Shenzhen University
 Southern University of Science and Technology
 Tsinghua Shenzhen International Graduate School
 Harbin Institute of Technology, Shenzhen
 Beijing Normal University
 Guangzhou University
 Foshan University
 Guangzhou Medical University
 Dongguan University of Technology
 Wuyi University
 Guangdong Ocean University

Hong Kong 
 University of Hong Kong
 Hong Kong University of Science and Technology
 City University of Hong Kong
 Hong Kong Baptist University
 Lingnan University
 Chinese University of Hong Kong
 Education University of Hong Kong
 Hong Kong Polytechnic University

Macau 
 University of Macau
 University of Saint Joseph
 Macao Institute for Tourism Studies
 City University of Macau
 Macau University of Science and Technology
 Macao Polytechnic University
 Kiang Wu Nursing College of Macau

List of Past Events 
 Guangdong-Hong Kong-Macau University Alliance Annual Meeting and Presidents Forum

References

External links 
 GHMUA Official Website

Higher education in China
Higher education in Hong Kong
Professional associations based in China
Educational institutions established in 2016
College and university associations and consortia in Asia